The Walla Walla expeditions were two movements of Indigenous people from the Columbian Plateau to Alta California during the mid-nineteenth century. The original expedition was organized to gain sizable populations of cattle for native peoples that lived on Columbian Plateau. Among the prominent members was Walla Walla leader Piupiumaksmaks, his son Toayahnu, Garry of the Spokanes and Cayuse headman Tawatoy. The first expedition arrived at New Helvetia in 1844. 

The Natives purchased several hundred cattle from American and Mexican settlers. However, a confrontation erupted with Toayahnu being killed by an American. The Plateau natives then escaped from the colony, losing all of their purchased livestock.

Toayahnu's death angered many indigenous people across multiple Columbian Plateau nations and for a while it was considered to exact revenge on John Sutter's colony with a mixed military force of 2,000. The Nez Perce Ellis was sent to Fort Vancouver as a delegate of the aggrieved parties. Meetings were held with Hudson's Bay Company officers John McLoughlin and James Douglas. Both men declaimed the Plateau natives attacking the white colonists in Sacramento Valley, stating that they wouldn't sell rifles or other military armaments for such action. Later Ellis would have talks with Elijah White, then Indian subagent for the region. White also voiced against military action, promising to forward the complaints to John Sutter, Thomas O. Larkin the American Consul for Alta California and Governor of Alta California Manuel Micheltorena.

The second expedition returned to New Helvetia in 1846, again with Piupiumaksmaks and Tawatoy, along with Lenape Tom Hill among others. Conflict was brewing in the region as the Conquest of California was then in full force. Initial reports among American settlers and military figures of the Walla Walla expedition claimed the force was over a thousand in size. However Piupiumaksmaks declaimed military action and requested peaceable relations and for further commercial transactions to commence. An estimated two thousand cattle was purchased. In addition, ten Walla Wallas were recruited to fight alongside Americans as scouts. When the expedition returned to the Columbian Plateau, it contained members ill with measles. The disease was spread across the Pacific Northwest and was a major cause of the Whitman massacre that occurred shortly after the expedition returned.

Background

The Sahaptin nations acquired horses through Northern Shoshone in the eighteenth century, radically changing their subsistence gathering patterns. Groups of Niimíipu, Cayuse and Walla Walla peoples began to hunt Plains bison across the Rocky Mountains throughout winters. Plateau natives had progressively explored regions lying to the south prior the expeditions. In 1841 Charles Wilkes stated that Piupiumaksmaks and Tawatoy were "going to the Shasta country to trade for blankets, powder and ball, together with trinkets and beads, in exchange for their horses and beaver-skins." Members of the Walla Walla nation later claimed that Piupiumaksmaks was horse raiding in modern California from an early age. As the Columbian Plateau became included in the expanding North American fur trade, additional materials and goods additionally altered their means of living. Regional trade was focused on Fort Nez Percés, a Hudson's Bay Company (HBC) post. These transactions didn't include livestock as the HBC station maintained a policy of keeping its supply of animals. Settlers from the United States of America began to emigrate to the Willamette Valley in the 1830s and traveled through the plateau. Small numbers of ox and cattle were purchased from them, adding to the large horse herds already established. Marcus Whitman reported to his superiors being lent two oxen from a Cayuse noble to establish Waiilaptu in 1836.

First expedition

Piupiumaksmaks' son, Toayahnu, formed the basis of the first expedition from his time among Euro-Americans. He was sent to reside at the Methodist Mission in 1836 under the supervision of Jason Lee. Christened after Elijah Hedding, Toayahnu spent several years among the whites in the Willamette Valley. He witnessed the success of the Willamette Cattle Company, a venture to procure cattle for the settlers from Alta California. Several hundred head were brought back overland and distributed among its subscribers, ensuring their rising material progress. After he returned to Walla Walla country, Toayahnu relayed this information to his father and other Indigenous leadership of the region. Efforts to organise a trading outfit to gain cattle in numbers solidified in 1844. The outfit contained a sizable number of members to ensure safety against potentially aggressive indigenous nations located between the Plateau and New Helvetia.

The total number of men numbered from an estimated 36 to 50, in addition to numerous women and children. Prominent members included Yellow Bird, Toayahnu, Young Chief, Spokane Garry along with other Nez Perce and Spokane headmen. These men dressed in "English costume", in the style of HBC officers. Accounts vary but there appears to have been minimal conflict throughout the indigenous nations the expedition passed through. John Sutter welcomed the expedition to his colony, having become acquainted with Yellow Bird while he stayed at Fort Vancouver. Commercial transactions began in earnest with settlers of the area. Stockpiles of Elk, Beaver and Deer furs were sold by the Salishan and Sahaptins for heads of cattle.

More livestock was desired however and members of the expedition left New Helvetia for the surrounding area. While hunting for additional deer and elk, a group of "mountain freebooters" were encountered and a skirmish ensued. No one of the expedition was grievously harmed and a number of horses and mules were gained from the fleeing men. A clash of cultures occurred when the group returned to New Helvetia as the beasts of burden were formerly property of settlers there. Mexican and American colonists demanded their return, offering initially ten and then fifteen cattle as recompense. Yellow Bird and others did not find the offer valid as it was custom among Plateau natives for horses taken from enemies to become the property of new holders.

Death of Toayahnu

A particular mule was identified by an American, Grove Cook, as once belonging to him. He immediately demanded its restitution and a confrontation ensued. Toayahnu came to the American and said "go now and take your mule" while holding a loaded rifle. Cook relented, despite Toayahnu insisting he was aiming at an eagle near by. Two days later along with Spokane Garry and Young Chief, Toayahnu entered a dwelling at New Helvetia. Several other Americans inside the building began to insult the group, with Cook stating "yesterday you was going to kill me, now you must die" to Toayahnu. After praying for a short while, the Walla Walla noble was murdered. Spokane Garry narrowly avoided being shot, and the expedition was able to break out of New Helvetia without any additional losses. The cattle purchased were left at the colony, making the first trip a failure.

Unrest among Plateau Indigenous people

When the expedition returned to the Plateau, their grievances were sent to the HBC by the Nez Perce Ellis. He met with John McLoughlin and James Douglas, with both men offering their condolences and sympathy. The company men did not offer any material support however. Next Ellis visited Elijah White then the U.S. Indian Sub-agent. White had previously made the Cayuse and Nez Perce adopt a system of laws that outlawed natives from killing whites and vice versa. Ellis demanded that Cook be brought to White to be punished as according to the laws. His powers were limited and restricted only to act as an American representative in the Pacific Northwest in dealings with indigenous people. Even then the region was formally jointly occupied between the United Kingdom of Great Britain and Ireland and the United States of America as the Oregon boundary dispute had yet to be settled. As New Helvetia was located within Mexican Alta California, White held no authority there and was unable to compel any resolution to the conflict. Ellis told White that there were three groups divided on how the Plateau natives should act. One faction felt it best to punish the Willamette Valley settlers as they were Americans, like Toayahnu's killers. Another faction preferred to establish what the reactions of the HBC and Willamette Valley settlers to action against the California colonists. A final block preferred military action against the California settlements as White recounted: 

He assured me that the Cayuse, Walla Wallas, Pend d'Oreilles, Flatheads, Nez Perces and Snakes, were all in terms of amity, and all that portion of the aggrieved party were for raising about two thousand warriors of these formidable tribes and march to California at once, and nobly revenge themselves on the inhabitants and then by plunder enrich themselves on the spoils.

Second expedition

Preparations for a small group of Cayuse and Walla Wallas to return to Alta California were eventually formed. Joel Palmer gave Piupiumaksmaks several gifts of tobacco and small goods in March 1846. The conversation eventually went to Toayahnu's murder as Palmer recalled that "... he expressed his determination to go to California this season." Besides Piupiumaksmaks, Tawatoy rejoined the group in command of a Cayuse contingent in addition to the Lenape scout Tom Hill. When the expedition entered Alta California in 1846, the region had entered a tumultuous period. The Mexican–American War was underway and forces loyal to the Americans had been marshaled to begin the Conquest of California. Close to 300 California Natives and 150 white settlers were assembled at New Helvetia under the authority of Joseph Warren Revere in anticipation of the Walla Walla and Cayuse band. Instead of arriving to fight however, Piupiumaksmaks wished to establish cordial relations. It has been suggested that he originally intended to attack the colony, only to find the military preparations discouraging. While Revere later lamented not being able to be "leading a most terrific charge into the midst of his warriors", the American officer agreed to listen to the Walla Walla noble. His speech was recorded by Revere as the following:

I have come from the forests of Oregon with no hostile intentions. You can see that I speak the truth, because I have brought with me only forty warriors, with their women and little children, and because I am here with few followers, and without arms. We have come to hunt the beasts of the field, and also to trade our horses for cattle; for my people require cattle, which are not so abundant in Oregon as in California. I have come, too, according to the custom of our tribes, to visit the grave of my poor son, Elijah, who was murdered by a white man. But I have not traveled thus far only to mourn. I demand justice! The blood of my slaughtered son calls for vengeance! I have told what brought me here; and when these objects are accomplished, I shall be satisfied, and shall return peaceably to my own country. When I came to California, I did not know that the Boston men [Americans] had taken the country from the Spaniards [Mexicans]. I am glad to hear it; for I have always been friendly to the Boston men, and have been kind to those who have passed through my territories. It must be plain to you that we did not set out on a hostile expedition against your countrymen.

Relations between the settlement and the visiting Plateau natives were then repaired. John C. Frémont arrived in the area shortly after the expedition encamped near New Helvetia. Ten Walla Walla men were recruited into the California Battalion as scouts. They would fight with distinction at the Battle of Natividad against the forces of José Castro. The remainder of the expedition remained in the Sacramento Valley. Records kept by Sutter's officers note interactions with Piupiumaksmaks until July 1847. He was given compensation for previous grievances, the primary cause being his son's death. After this, the expedition "left contented and started homeward." The amount of cattle purchased by Walla Wallas in the expedition numbered close to two thousand.

Measles epidemic

A lasting consequence of the second Walla Walla expedition was the dispersion of measles from California into the modern states and provinces of Oregon, Washington, Idaho, Montana, British Columbia and Alaska. The illness was carried from New Helvetia back to the Walla Walla and Cayuse homelands, quickly spreading across the region. Paul Kane was among the Walla Walla when the expedition returned in July 1847. A son of Piupiumaksmaks arrived several days in advance of the main party and informed his brethren the deaths caused from measles. The speech lasted almost three hours and close to thirty people were counted as dead. After the speech Kane said that the Indigenous "sent messengers in every direction on horseback spread the news of the disaster among all the neighbouring tribes ..." This passage has been used to reconstruct the spread of the illness across the Pacific Northwest. Along with other causes, the tension caused from measles induced deaths among Cayuse raised simmering tensions with ABCFM missionary Marcus Whitman to a boil. Particular Cayuse held Marcus accountable for the deaths, killing him and several other people in an event known as the Whitman Massacre.

References

Native American history of Oregon
History of Washington (state)
1844 in Alta California
1846 in Alta California
History of Sacramento, California
Mexican California
Native American history of California